Not to Us is the second studio album by Chris Tomlin, released in 2002.

Track listing

Personnel 
 Chris Tomlin – lead vocals, acoustic guitar, backing vocals (1)
 Daniel Carson – electric guitar, acoustic guitar, backing vocals (3)
 Jesse Reeves – bass guitar
 Joey Parish – drums, percussion, tambourine

Additional musicians
 Bruce Gaitsch – acoustic guitars (2, 4, 6–9)
 Matt Bronleewe – acoustic guitars (3, 4), electric guitars (4, 5, 6, 8)
 Jeremy Bose – acoustic piano (6, 9), accordion (7), Wurlitzer electric piano (10)
 Phil Madeira – Hammond organ (6, 7)
 Will Sayles – shaker (2), percussion (4, 5, 8)
 David Angell – strings (4, 6, 9, 10)
 David Davidson – strings (4, 6, 9, 10)
 Grant Cunningham – backing vocals (1–5, 7–10)
 Choir on "Famous One" – Gathering of friends at The Woodlands United Methodist Church
 Choir on "Come Let Us Worship" – The Worship of God Conference Choir

Production
 Matt Bronleewe – producer
 Sam Gibson – producer, recording engineer, mixing at The Sound Kitchen, Franklin, Tennessee (1, 4, 9, 10)
 Louie Giglio – executive producer
 Grant Cunningham – executive producer
 Bennett House, Franklin, Tennessee – recording location
 David Streit – assistant engineer
 F. Reid Shippen – mixing at Recording Arts, Nashville, Tennessee (2, 3, 5–8)
 Adam Dean – mix assistant (1, 4, 9, 10)
 Dan Shike – mix assistant (2, 3, 5–8)
 Stephen Marcussen – mastering at Marcussen Mastering, Hollywood, California
 Christiév Carothers – creative direction
 Kristin Barlowe – photography
 Jan Cook – art direction
 Benji Peck – art direction, design

References

2002 albums
Chris Tomlin albums